The Bucklige Welt is a region in southeast Lower Austria. It is also known as the "land of  a thousand hills" (Land der 1000 Hügel).

Geography 

The Bucklige Welt is a hill country area on the eastern edge of the Alps. Its name, which means something like "hilly world", is due to the very large number of hills and mountains which are known by the locals as Buckln.

In the southwest the Bucklige Welt is bounded by the Wechsel massif and in the west by the Semmering region. To the north it descends into the Vienna Basin, into which it is drained by the Pitten. To the east the Rosalia Mountains form the boundary, to the south of which the Bucklige Welt faces Oberpullendorf in the Central Burgenland Bay. To the south is the Geschriebenstein.

References

External links 

 Common region of Bucklige Welt

 
Mountain ranges of the Alps
Regions of Austria
Neunkirchen District, Austria
Mountain ranges of Styria
Mountain ranges of Lower Austria